The 1965 Milan–San Remo was the 56th edition of the Milan–San Remo cycle race and was held on 19 March 1965. The race started in Milan and finished in San Remo. The race was won by Arie den Hartog of the Ford France team.

General classification

References

1965
1965 in road cycling
1965 in Italian sport
March 1965 sports events in Europe
1965 Super Prestige Pernod